(Pride and Prejudice) is a three-act opéra comique by Daniel Nelson, to a libretto by Swedish playwright  (born 1968) based on the popular 1813 English novel by Jane Austen.

The piece was written in 2010 to 2011 for the opera festival at Vadstena. Before the premiere the composer expressed his view of the work as an operetta in the sense that "a direct and immediate communication with an audience" is planned. One reviewer of the premiere noted musical influences of Michel Legrand and Igor Stravinsky in the score.

The premiere took place on 21 July 2011, at Vadstena Castle, Sweden, with  conducting soloists and the Vadstena Academy Opera Orchestra. A small ensemble is used: one flute, oboe, clarinet, horn, trumpet,
a harp, piano, and strings and one percussionist.

Roles

The plot follows closely that in the novel, although some characters (Lady Catherine de Bourgh, Mary Bennet) do not appear.

Nine video extracts from the first production have been uploaded by the composer to YouTube.

References

Swedish-language operas
Operas
Opéras comiques
2011 operas
Operas based on novels
Works based on Pride and Prejudice